The Chinese Ambassador to Benin  is the official representative of the People's Republic of China to the Republic of Benin.

List of representatives

See also
Ambassadors of the People's Republic of China

References

Ben
China